The following is a list of people executed by the U.S. state of Texas between 1990 and 1999. All of the 166 people (165 males and 1 female) during this period were convicted of murder and have been executed by lethal injection at the Huntsville Unit in Huntsville, Texas.

Executions 1990–1999
The number in the "#" column indicates the nth person executed since 1982 (when Texas resumed the death penalty).  As an example, Jerome Butler (the first person executed in Texas during the 1990 decade) was the 34th person executed since resumption of the death penalty.

Notes

See also
Capital punishment in Texas

References

External links
Death Row Information. Texas Department of Criminal Justice

1990
20th-century executions by Texas
1990s-related lists
1990s in Texas